Mexicana Universal Guerrero is a pageant in Guerrero, Mexico, that selects that state's representative for the national Mexicana Universal pageant.

In 2000, 2001, 2002, 2005 and 2007 was not sent to a State Representative. On 2014 and 2015 the winners renounced to the Title days before to National Competition for personal reasons.

The State Organization hasn't had a national winner in Nuestra Belleza México/Mexicana Universal.

Titleholders
Below are the names of the annual titleholders of Mexicana Universal Guerrero, listed in ascending order, and their final placements in the Mexicana Universal after their participation, until 2017 the names was Nuestra Belleza Guerrero.

 Competed in Miss Universe.
 Competed in Miss International.
 Competed in Miss Charm International.
 Competed in Miss Continente Americano.
 Competed in Reina Hispanoamericana.
 Competed in Miss Orb International.
 Competed in Nuestra Latinoamericana Universal.

External links
Official Website

Nuestra Belleza México